Melanochyla fasciculiflora is a species of plant in the family Anacardiaceae. It is endemic to Peninsular Malaysia.

References

fasciculiflora
Endemic flora of Peninsular Malaysia
Vulnerable plants
Taxonomy articles created by Polbot